KCCI is a television station licensed to Des Moines, Iowa, United States.

KCCI may also refer to:

 Karachi Chamber of Commerce & Industry
 Kuwait Chamber of Commerce and Industry
 Kashmir Chamber of Commerce and Industry